The 1943–44 OB I bajnokság season was the eighth season of the OB I bajnokság, the top level of ice hockey in Hungary. Five teams participated in the final round of the league, and BKE Budapest won the championship.

Regular season

Budapest Group

South Group

Kassa Group
 Kassai VSC qualified for final round.

Erdély Group

Final round

External links
 Season on hockeyarchives.info

Hun
OB I bajnoksag seasons
1943–44 in Hungarian ice hockey